McDonough County is a county in the U.S. state of Illinois. According to the 2010 census, it had a population of 32,612. Its county seat is Macomb.

The Macomb, IL Micropolitan Statistical Area includes all of McDonough County.

History

McDonough County is named in honor of Thomas Macdonough who defeated a British squadron in the decisive naval Battle of Lake Champlain in the War of 1812. McDonough County was part of the "Military Tract" set aside by Congress for veterans of the War of 1812.

Geography

The county has the unusual distinction of forming a perfect square by Mercator map projection.  The county seat, Macomb, is in the center of the county, and the courthouse is almost precisely in the center of the county.

Public transit
 Go West Transit
 Macomb station

Major highways
  U.S. Route 67
  U.S. Route 136
  Illinois Route 9
  Illinois Route 41
  Illinois Route 61
  Illinois Route 95
  Illinois Route 110

Adjacent counties
 Henderson County - northwest
 Warren County - north
 Fulton County - east
 Schuyler County - south
 Hancock County - west

Demographics

As of the 2010 United States Census, there were 32,612 people, 13,057 households, and 6,724 families residing in the county. The racial makeup of the county was 90.4% white, 5.0% black or African American, 1.8% Asian, 0.2% American Indian, 0.7% from other races, and 1.8% from two or more races. Those of Hispanic or Latino origin made up 2.7% of the population. In terms of ancestry, 25.0% were German, 14.7% were American, 13.7% were Irish, 12.7% were English, and 5.1% were Italian.

Of the 13,057 households, 22.0% had children under the age of 18 living with them, 40.0% were married couples living together, 8.0% had a female householder with no husband present, 48.5% were non-families, and 33.9% of all households were made up of individuals. The average household size was 2.19 and the average family size was 2.80. The median age was 28.9 years.

The median income for a household in the county was $33,702 and the median income for a family was $52,390. Males had a median income of $42,297 versus $28,530 for females. The per capita income for the county was $18,344. About 12.8% of families and 23.7% of the population were below the poverty line, including 21.7% of those under age 18 and 9.4% of those age 65 or over.

Politics

McDonough County is located in Illinois’ 18th Congressional District and is currently represented by Republican Darin LaHood. For the Illinois House of Representatives, the county is located in the 93rd district and is currently represented by Republican Norine Hammond. The county is located in the 47th district of the Illinois Senate, and is currently represented by Republican Jil Tracy.

In presidential elections, McDonough County was once reliably Republican, voting for the Republican candidate in all but two elections (1912 & 1932) from 1892 to 1988. Since 1988, the county has become more competitive, with Democrats carrying the county three out of seven times and holding the Republican candidate's margin of victory to under four points three times. In 2020, however, McDonough County went for Trump by a margin of 16.5%.

Climate and weather

Communities

Cities
 Bushnell
 Colchester
 Macomb (seat)

Villages

 Bardolph
 Blandinsville
 Good Hope
 Industry
 Prairie City
 Sciota
 Tennessee

Census-designated places
 Adair
 Georgetown

Other unincorporated place
 Colmar
 Doddsville
 Fandon
 Scottsburg
 Walnut Grove

Townships

 Bethel Township
 Blandinsville Township
 Bushnell Township
 Chalmers Township
 Colchester Township
 Eldorado Township
 Emmet Township
 Hire Township
 Industry Township
 Lamoine Township
 Macomb Township
 Macomb City Township
 Mound Township
 New Salem Township
 Prairie City Township
 Sciota Township
 Scotland Township
 Tennessee Township
 Walnut Grove Township

See also
 National Register of Historic Places listings in McDonough County, Illinois

References

External links
 
 http://www.outfitters.com/illinois/mcdonough/
 https://web.archive.org/web/20071012114524/http://www.cyberdriveillinois.com/departments/archives/irad/mcdonough.html
 McDonough County website

 
1826 establishments in Illinois
Illinois counties
Populated places established in 1826